= Wirtembergisches Repertorium der Literatur =

The Wirtembergisches Repertorium der Literatur (Württembergish Inventory of Literature) was a quarterly literary journal published by Friedrich Schiller and Johann Wilhelm Petersen in Ulm in 1782 and 1783.
